Ginger Gonzaga  (born May 17, 1983) is an American comedian and actress. She plays Nikki Ramos, best friend of Jennifer Walters/She-Hulk in the Disney+ series She-Hulk: Attorney at Law.

Early life
Gonzaga grew up in Modesto, California, where she attended Beyer High School. Her mother is Dutch and her father Filipino. She went to the University of California, Berkeley and University of California, Santa Barbara, where she majored in political science. Gonzaga graduated a year early to train at The Groundlings school, and went on to study improv at Second City and Upright Citizens Brigade.

Career
Gonzaga hosted Hulu's comedic daily pop culture recap show The Morning After. She was a regular on ABC's Mixology, which ran for thirteen episodes. She has also appeared in numerous other television shows, including Togetherness, I'm Dying Up Here, Wrecked, Kidding, and Room 104.

In 2019, she had a role in Paul Rudd's series Living with Yourself.
She portrays "the Angry Young Congresswoman" Anabela Ysidro-Campos, also known as simply AYC, a character based on Congresswoman Alexandria Ocasio-Cortez, in the 2020 satirical space comedy Space Force. In January 2021, she was cast in the Disney+ streaming series She-Hulk: Attorney at Law for Marvel Studios, playing Jennifer Walters / She-Hulk's best friend, Nikki.

Gonzaga portrays Helen Tasker in the 2023 CBS series adaptation of the 1994 film True Lies.

Personal life
Gonzaga was in a relationship with actor Jim Carrey from 2018 to 2019. Gonzaga is bisexual.

Selected filmography

Film

Television

References

External links
 
 

1983 births
Living people
University of California, Santa Barbara alumni
American women comedians
University of California, Berkeley alumni
American web series actresses
Actresses from Modesto, California
American television actresses
21st-century American actresses
American actresses of Filipino descent
American people of Dutch descent
Bisexual actresses
American film actresses
American LGBT people of Asian descent